is a Japanese Nippon Professional Baseball pitcher.

External links

1979 births
Fukuoka SoftBank Hawks players
Japanese baseball players
Living people
Nippon Professional Baseball pitchers
Saitama Seibu Lions players
Seibu Lions players
Baseball people from Fukuoka Prefecture